Revealer of Secrets, first published in 1819, is an epistolary novel by Joseph Perl, a proponent of Jewish emancipation and Haskalah. It is often considered the first modern novel in Hebrew. The book purports to be a collection of letters between various hasidic rabbis, but is actually a satire of their teachings. 

It is an unusual book in that it satirizes the language and style of early hasidic rabbis writing in Hebrew, which was not the vernacular of the Jews of its time. To make his work available and accessible to his contemporaries, Perl translated his own work into Yiddish. It is currently in print only in an English translation, by Dov Taylor, published by Westview Press.

Sources 

 Dov Taylor. Joseph Perl's Revealer of Secrets: The First Hebrew Novel. Westview Press. Boulder, Colorado. 1997. Translation with notes, commentary, and introductory materials.  

1819 novels
Epistolary novels
Hebrew-language novels